The 3rd Battalion (West Yorkshire), Yorkshire Volunteers was an infantry battalion of the only full Territorial Army (TA) regiment in Yorkshire.  The battalion was formed along with the 2nd (Yorkshire and Humberside) Battalion of the same regiment in 1971.  However, in 1992 following the end of the Cold War, the 3rd and 4th battalions amalgamated, thus ending the official lineage.

Formation 
In 1967, the former Territorial Army (TA) was subsumed into the much smaller Territorial and Army Volunteer Reserve, of which a new regiment, the Yorkshire Volunteers (YORKS) was formed.  This new regiment would only maintain one battalion until 1971, when many of the cadres formed in 1967 were reformed, and the YORKS regiment was expanded into three battalions.  Therefore, on 1 April 1971 the 3rd Battalion, Yorkshire Volunteers were formed from cadres of the West Yorkshire TA.

On formation, the new battalion was organised as follows:

 Battalion Headquarters, in Huddersfield
 Headquarters Company, in Huddersfield (from cadre of the West Yorkshire Battalion, The Duke of Wellington's Regiment)
 A (The West Riding Artillery) Battery, in Bradford with detachment in Keighley (from cadre of the West Riding Regiment, Royal Artillery) – later redesignated as a 'Company'
 B (The Sheffield Artillery Volunteers) Battery, in Rotherham (from cadre of the Sheffield Artillery Volunteers, Royal Artillery) – later redesignated as a 'Company'
 C (The Duke of Wellington's Regiment) Company, in Huddersfield (from cadre of the West Riding Battalion, The Duke of Wellington's Regiment)
 D (Hallamshire) Company, in Barnsley (from cadre of the Hallamshire Battalion, York and Lancaster Regiment)

Service 
In 1975, A (WRA) Company moved to Keighley, while retaining their detachment at Bradford.  In 1984, as part of the 1981 Defence White Paper, the 'Home Service Force' was formed, which maintained a company in every TA battalion/regiment by 1992. This new force was tasked with defending important locations and would be made up of mostly retired TA or Regular Army personnel.  Therefore, in 1984 H (Home Service Force) Company was formed in Huddersfield.

On 1 January 1988, the 4th Battalion (South Yorkshire), Yorkshire Volunteers was formed, and the 3rd battalion was subsequently reorganised.  B (Sheffield Artillery Volunteers) Bty in Rotherham and D (Hallamshire) Company in Barnsley transferred to the new battalion as B (Sheffield Artillery Volunterers) and A (Hallamshire) Companies respectively.  A new B (The Leeds Rifles) Company was formed in Leeds by transfer of A Company of the 1st Battalion; a new D (The Duke of Wellington's Regiment) Company was formed in Halifax by transfer of C Company of the 1st Battalion.

By 1989, the battalion was part of the 54th (East Anglian) Infantry Brigade which was tasked with guarding the North Eastern/Eastern ports if mobilised for war against the Warsaw Pact.  On 17 January 1989, the battalion was redesignated as the 3rd Battalion (West Yorkshire), Yorkshire Volunteers.

At this time, the battalion was organised as follows:

 Battalion Headquarters, in Huddersfield
 Headquarters Company, in Huddersfield
 A (The West Riding Artillery) Company, in Keighley with detachment in Bradford
 B (The Leeds Rifles) Company, in Leeds
 C (The Duke of Wellington's Regiment) Company, in Huddersfield
 D (The Duke of Wellington's Regiment) Company, in Halifax
 H (Home Service Force) Company, in Huddersfield

Disbandment 
In 1992, following the Dissolution of the Soviet Union and subsequent end of the Cold War, the Options for Change reform was announced which significantly reduced the size of the British Armed Forces.  As part of this reform, the TA was also reduced, with many battalions being disbanded or reduced in size.  On 4 April 1992, the battalion amalgamated with the 4th Battalion (South Yorkshire) to form the new 3rd/4th Battalion, Yorkshire Volunteers.

As a result of the amalgamation, HQ company was disbanded, with personnel to the new HQ and C Companies of the new battalion; A (West Riding Artillery) and D (Duke of Wellington's Regiment) Companies were amalgamated to form B (The Duke of Wellington's Regiment) Company; and C (The Duke of Wellington's Regiment) Company was transferred to the new battalion un-altered.  B (Leeds Rifles) Company was transferred as C (The Leeds Rifles) Company in the 2nd Battalion, while H (Home Service Force) Company was disbanded following the disbandment of the Home Service Force.

Honorary colonels 
Honorary colonels of the battalion included:

 1 April 1971 – 23 November 1972: vacant
 23 November 1972 – 23 November 1977: Major General Ronald Macauley Somerville
 23 November 1977 – 23 November 1983: Major General Donald Edward Isles
 23 November 1983 – 30 April 1990: General Sir Martin Farndale
 30 April 1990 – 4 April 1992: Brigadier William Richard Mundell

In 1971 and 1972, each company maintained their own 'Deputy Honorary Colonels, however this ended in 1972.

 Footnotes NotesCitations'''

 References 

 Wienand Drenth, The Territorial Army 1967–2000, 2000, Einhoven, Kingdom of the Netherlands.
 Frederick, J. B. M. (1984). Lineage book of British land forces 1660–1978 : biographical outlines of cavalry, yeomanry, armour, artillery, infantry, marines and air force land troops of regular and reserve forces (Volume I). Wakefield, United Kingdom of Great Britain and Northern Ireland: Microform Academic. . .
 Frederick, J. B. M. (1984). Lineage book of British land forces 1660–1978 : biographical outlines of cavalry, yeomanry, armour, artillery, infantry, marines and air force land troops of regular and reserve forces (Volume II)''. Wakefield, United Kingdom of Great Britain and Northern Ireland: Microform Academic. . .

Military units and formations established in 1971
Military units and formations disestablished in 1992
Military units and formations in the West Riding of Yorkshire
1971 establishments in the United Kingdom
1992 disestablishments in the United Kingdom
Yorkshire Volunteers